Ponteceso is a municipality of northwestern Spain in the province of A Coruña, in the autonomous community of Galicia. It belongs to the comarca of Bergantiños.

The name of the place comes from Latin "pons caesus" ("closed bridge").

Demography 
From:INE Archiv

References

Municipalities in the Province of A Coruña